Laura Allred is an American comics artist who is best known for her work as a colorist with her husband, the writer/artist Mike Allred.

Awards 
 1995: Won "Favorite Colorist" Wizard Fan Award
 1998: Nominated for "Best Colorist" Eisner Award, for Red Rocket 7
 2000: Nominated for "Best Colorist" Eisner Award, for Madman Comics and Happydale: Devils in the Desert
 2005: Special AML Award with Mike Allred for The Golden Plates
 2012: Won "Best Coloring" Eisner Award, for iZombie (Vertigo/DC Comics) and Madman All-New Giant-Size Super-Ginchy Special (Image Comics)
 2016: Won "Best Colorist" Harvey Award, for Silver Surfer
 2017: Finalist for an AML Award with Mike Allred and Lee Allred Batman '66 and Legion of Super Heroes #1
 2019: Finalist for an AML Award with Mike Allred, Lee Allred, and Rich Tommaso for Dick Tracy: Dead or Alive
 2021: Won "Best Coloring" Eisner Award, for Bowie: Stardust, Rayguns and Moonage Daydreams (Insight Comics) and X-Ray Robot (Dark Horse Comics)

References

External links 

American female comics artists
Comics colorists
DC Comics people
Living people
Marvel Comics people
Year of birth missing (living people)
Eisner Award winners for Best Coloring